Grand Isle is a town on Grand Isle in Grand Isle County, Vermont, United States. The population was 2,086 at the 2020 census.

A landing for the Lake Champlain Transportation Company's ferry to Plattsburgh, New York, at Cumberland Head is located on the western shore of Grand Isle at Gordon's Landing.

History
The town was originally named "Middle Hero" when it was subdivided from the town of "South Hero" in November 1798. In November 1810, the town was renamed "Grand Isle".

Geography

The town of Grand Isle occupies the northern half of South Hero Island, also known as "Grand Isle", in Lake Champlain. It is bordered to the south by the town of South Hero and to the north by the town of North Hero, both in Grand Isle County. To the west, across the western channel of Lake Champlain, is the town of Plattsburgh in Clinton County, New York, while to the east, across the eastern channel of Lake Champlain, is the town of Milton in Chittenden County, and the town of St. Albans in Franklin County. The town of Grand Isle includes Savage Island in the eastern part of town, and the much smaller Young Island and Bixby Island, comprising the Sister Islands, in the northwestern part of town. Grand Isle State Park, with frontage on Lake Champlain, is in the southeastern part of town.

Demographics

As of the census of 2000, there were 1,955 people, 772 households, and 572 families residing in the town.  The population density was 118.4 people per square mile (45.7/km2).  There were 1,047 housing units at an average density of 63.4 per square mile (24.5/km2).  The racial makeup of the town was 97.54% White, 0.20% African American, 0.31% Native American, 0.36% Asian, and 1.59% from two or more races. Hispanic or Latino of any race were 0.56% of the population.

There were 772 households, out of which 32.8% had children under the age of 18 living with them, 63.2% were married couples living together, 7.1% had a female householder with no husband present, and 25.9% were non-families. 20.2% of all households were made up of individuals, and 6.9% had someone living alone who was 65 years of age or older.  The average household size was 2.53 and the average family size was 2.91.

In the town, the population was spread out, with 25.3% under the age of 18, 4.9% from 18 to 24, 30.1% from 25 to 44, 29.4% from 45 to 64, and 10.4% who were 65 years of age or older.  The median age was 40 years. For every 100 females, there were 101.3 males.  For every 100 females age 18 and over, there were 98.6 males.

The median income for a household in the town was $48,594, and the median income for a family was $52,143. Males had a median income of $39,191 versus $25,900 for females. The per capita income for the town was $22,955.  About 2.7% of families and 4.2% of the population were below the poverty line, including 2.5% of those under age 18 and 6.4% of those age 65 or over.

Notable person
Herman R. Beardsley, Justice of the Vermont Supreme Court

References

External links
 Town of Grand Isle official website
 Grand Isle School
 Grand Isle State Park

 
Towns in Vermont
Burlington, Vermont metropolitan area
Towns in Grand Isle County, Vermont